Willard F. Currier is an American college baseball coach, currently serving as head coach of the Fairfield Stags baseball team.  He was named to that position prior to the 2012 NCAA Division I baseball season.  He was previously the head coach at Vermont (its winningest ever) before the university cut the baseball program after the 2009 season.

Playing career
Currier played at Vermont under Jack Leggett from 1979 through 1981. He was drafted in the sixth round of the 1981 MLB Draft by the Philadelphia Phillies.  He played three seasons in the Phillies organization in Class A.

Coaching career
He returned to Vermont as an assistant coach and completed his degree in 1984. He then assisted Leggett at Western Carolina before earning his first head coaching job at Mitchell College, then a junior college. In 1988, Currier succeeded Mike Stone as head coach at Vermont.  Currier would coach the Catamounts for 22 seasons, compiling a 486–470 record prior to the program's end in 2009.  He was named America East Coach of the Year three times. He then served the 2010 season at Tennessee before being named head coach in waiting at Fairfield for the 2011 season and being elevated to the top job in 2012.

At Fairfield, Currier was named the MAAC Coach of the Year in 2012, his first season as the Stags' head coach. That year, the team went 14–10 in MAAC play and reached the playoffs for the first time since 2000.  Senior shortstop Larry Cornelia and sophomore outfielder Ryan Plourde were both all-conference selections, giving Fairfield multiple all-league honorees for the first time since 2008.  In 2014, Fairfield went 32-24 (15-8 MAAC), finishing third in the program's first 30-win season.  Plourde, Jake Salpietro, and EJ Ashworth were named to the All-MAAC First Team.  The Stags won their first two games in the MAAC Tournament, defeating #6 seed Manhattan and #2 Siena before losses to top-seeded Canisius and Siena knocked them out of the tournament.

Head coaching record
Below is a table of Currier's yearly records as an NCAA head baseball coach.

See also
List of current NCAA Division I baseball coaches

Notelist

References

External links

Living people
1960 births
Baseball players from Vermont
Fairfield Stags baseball coaches
Mitchell Mariners baseball coaches
Peninsula Pilots players
People from Essex, Vermont
Spartanburg Phillies players
Spartanburg Traders players
Tennessee Volunteers baseball coaches
Vermont Catamounts baseball coaches
Vermont Catamounts baseball players
Western Carolina Catamounts baseball coaches
Western Carolina University alumni